Subbotniki is a rural locality (a settlement) in Vereshchaginskoye Urban Settlement, Vereshchaginsky District, Perm Krai, Russia.  The population was 400 as of 2010.

Geography 

References 

Rural localities in Vereshchaginsky District